Elaphromyia is a genus of tephritid  or fruit flies in the family Tephritidae.

Species
Hyaloctoides bioculatus (Bezzi, 1920)
Hyaloctoides gorgoneus Hering, 1958
Hyaloctoides semiater (Loew, 1861)
Hyaloctoides sokotrensis (Hering, 1939)
Hyaloctoides superhyalinus (Munro, 1929)

References

Tephritinae
Tephritidae genera
Diptera of Africa